Compsolechia seductella is a moth of the family Gelechiidae. It was described by Francis Walker in 1864. It is found in Amazonas, Brazil.

Adults are fawn coloured, the forewings with a few elongated black points near the base, and with a few black streaks of various sizes in the disc. There is a curved white exterior line which is composed of points, except towards the costa, where it is entire and retracted. There are also a few exterior white streaks, which are accompanied by three deep black streaks. The marginal line is a pale fawn colour. The hindwings are cupreous brown.

Hostplants: This species feeds on Miconia sp. and Clidemia sp., including Clidemia hirta.

References

Moths described in 1864
Compsolechia